Mozzate is a comune in the southwestern part of the province of Como, Lombardy, northern Italy.

The postal code of Mozzate is 22076, and the telephone code is 0331.

Mozzate hosts the Rohm and Haas plant, which produces adhesives used in the packaging and automotive industries.

External links
website (in Italian)